Poem of the Sea is a 1958 Soviet drama film directed by Yuliya Solntseva.

Plot 
To build the Kakhovka hydroelectric station, it is necessary to flood a lot of Ukrainian settlements. The film tells about people who tragically say goodbye to them...

Cast 
 Boris Livanov as general Ignat Fyodorchenko (as B. Livanov)
 Boris Andreyev as Savva Zarudnyi (as B. Andreyev)
 Mikhail Tsaryov as Aristarkhov (as M. Tsaryov)
 Mikhail Romanov as Pisatel (as M. Romanov)
 Zinaida Kirienko as Katerina (as Z. Kiriyenko)
 Ivan Kozlovsky as Kobzar (as I. Kozlovskiy)
 Leonid Tarabarinov as Valeriy Golik (as L. Tarabarinov)
 Georgi Kovrov as Maksim Fyodorchenko (as G. Kovrov)
 Mariya Vital as Antonina
 Evgeniy Bondarenko as Ivan Kravchina (as Ye. Bondarenko)

References

External links 
 

1958 films
1950s Russian-language films
Soviet drama films
1958 drama films